Makarpura railway station is a small railway station on the Western Railway network in the state of Gujarat, India. It serves Makarpura area of Vadodara city. Passenger and MEMU trains halt here.

References

Railway stations in Vadodara district
Vadodara railway division